Williams Okofo-Dateh is a Ghanaian politician and member of parliament for the Jaman South constituency in the Bono region of Ghana.

Early life and education 
Williams was born on 15 October 1981 and hails from Drobo Faaman in the Bono region of Ghana. He had his basic education in 1993 and had his SSSCE in General Arts in 1996. He also had his certificate in Education in 2001 and his Degree in Education in Population and Family Life in 2007 and further had his master's degree in International Relations and Aid in 2010.

Career 
Williams is a farmer.

Political career 
He is a member of NDC and currently the MP for Jaman South Constituency. He won the parliamentary seat with 24,422 votes whilst the incumbent Yaw Afful had 22,519 votes and the CPP parliamentary aspirant Samuel Boadu had 165 votes.

Committees 
He is a member of the Judiciary Committee and also a member of the Foreign Affairs Committee.

Personal life 
Williams is a Christian.

Philanthropy 
In June 2021, Williams started a rice production project in the Jaman South constituency to engage youth in the cultivation of rice using modern farming technologies, marketing and packaging innovations. He presented 33 bags of 45 kilograms of rice seeds, a box of Wellington boots and three boxes of weedicide to the Aboukrom Rice Farmers Association.

References 

1981 births
Living people
Ghanaian MPs 2021–2025
National Democratic Congress (Ghana) politicians